Qʼanjobʼal, (also Kanjobal) is a Mayan language spoken primarily in Guatemala and part of Mexico. According to 1998 estimates compiled by SIL International in Ethnologue, there were approximately 77,700 native speakers, primarily in the Huehuetenango Department of Guatemala. Municipalities where the Qʼanjobʼal language is spoken include San Juan Ixcoy (Yich Kʼox), San Pedro Soloma (Tzʼulumaʼ ), Santa Eulalia (Jolom Konobʼ ), Santa Cruz Barillas (Yalmotx), San Rafael La Independencia, and San Miguel Acatán (Pedro Mateo Pedro 2010). Qʼanjobʼal is taught in public schools through Guatemala's intercultural bilingual education programs.

Classification
Qʼanjobʼal is a member of the Qʼanjobʼalan branch of the Mayan language family. The Mayan language family includes 31 languages, two of which are now extinct. The Qʼanjobʼalan branch includes not only Qʼanjobʼal itself but also Chuj, Akatek, and Jakaltek, also spoken in Guatemala. The Qʼanjobʼalan languages are noted for being among the most conservative of the Mayan language family, although they do include some interesting innovations.

Phonology
Qʼanjobʼal consists of 26 consonant sounds and 5 vowel sounds. The letters of the alphabet are as follows: 

The ʼ in chʼ, kʼ, qʼ, tʼ, txʼ, and tzʼ represents an ejective or glottalic egressive, i.e., the consonant is accompanied by a puff of air from the glottis.  The letter r in Qʼanjobʼal has a limited distribution.  It is used mostly in borrowings, primarily in words borrowed from Spanish, such as roxax, rose, from Spanish rosa. It is also used in affect and positional words like kʼarari 'noise of an old engine or the like', jeran 'to be in a broken position/form'. The letters tx and x represent retroflex consonants, pronounced with the tongue curled backward in the mouth. It is believed such retroflection in Qʼanjobʼal is an influence from the Mamean Mayan languages.

Stress
Primary stress in Qʼanjobʼal is fairly simple. Words in isolation and in final phrase boundaries bear stress on the last syllable. However, words within a phrasal unit (not in final phrase boundary) bear stress on their first syllable.

Morphology and syntax

Verbs
As in all Mayan languages, Qʼanjobʼal classifies all verbs as either inherently intransitive (calling up only one argument) or as inherently transitive (calling up two arguments). Qʼanjobʼal is an ergative–absolutive language, in which the subject of a transitive verb takes an ergative affix, while the subject of an intransitive verb, as well as the object of a transitive verb, takes an absolutive affix.

There are two sets of affixes for ergative: the first set is used for those verbal roots beginning with a consonant, and the second set is used for those beginning with a vowel.

Ergative affixes are also used for possession.

There is only one set of absolutive affixes with two variations: pronounced like free words or attached to something else. Note that the third person absolutive affix is Ø, i.e., unmarked or empty.

However, while verbs are classified as either ergative or absolutive and take their own respective sets of pronoun affixes, this rule is altered in certain cases, such as when a verb becomes progressive:

but,

Aspect
In Qʼanjobʼal, aspect (whether an action has been completed or not) is more important than tense. Thus, in most utterances, one will indicate whether the action is incompletive, or whether it is completed, or may happen in the future, in which case it is considered 'unreal', or of irrealis mood, the event still only in the realm of thought or imagination.

Incompletive
Ch(i) is used to indicate that an event is incomplete or ongoing at some time:

Completive
Max or x- (both forms are used in free variation) are used to indicate that an event is complete:

Future/Irrealis
The prefix hoq- with the suffix -oq are used to indicate that the event spoken of has not yet happened, but remains only in the realm of the 'unreal' with only the potential for occurrence in the future:

Negative
Negative particles include kʼam and manaq:

Interrogative
Questions can be formed simply by using rising intonation with declarative syntax:

There is also a question particle, mi:

(Used as common form of greeting, like English 'How are you?')

Affixation
Many different affixes are used in Qʼanjobʼal, both prefixes and suffixes. Among these are aj-, used to denote the doer or leader of an action: ajtzʼibʼ, ʼwriterʼ (< tzʼibʼ 'write'), ajbʼe, 'spiritual guide' (< bʼe 'road'); -bʼal, used to indicate the location where something happens: tzombʼal 'market' (< tzon 'buy'); -al, -alil, -il, used to derive abstract nouns from adjectives, adverbs, numerals, transitive verb roots, and nouns: syalixhal 'his/her smallness' (< yalixh 'small'); swinaqil 'husband' (< winaq 'man'); -kʼulal, to derive nouns from intransitive verbs, adjectives, other nouns, etc.: watxkʼulal 'friendliness'; -oj, nominalizer, turning verbs into nouns: kuyoj 'studying' (< kuy 'study').

Word order
Qʼanjobʼal has a fixed word order. It follows a verb–subject–object (VSO) word order.  All changes to this word order are driven by pragmatic or syntactic factors like focus, negation, interrogation, relativization, etc.  These are subject to an ergative–absolutive pattern where arguments cross-referenced by ergative affixes must become absolutives prior to their fronting (focus, negation, etc.).  This results in some possible subject–verb (SV), object–verb–subject (OVS) orders.  However SVO, SOV and OSV are not possible (or, at least, not attested in any known corpus). The apparent exception is in reflexives and reflexive possessives, where the reflexive phrase ERG-bʼa (noun) or reflexive possessive ERG-noun appears directly following the verb.

Classifiers
Some Qʼanjobʼal nouns require that certain classifiers be used with them.  Among these are no''' (animals), te (trees/wood), ix (female), naq (male), chʼen (stone/metal), xim (corn), and an (plants).

Reduplication
Reduplication, or duplication of a root word, is a minor process in the formation of Qʼanjobʼal vocabulary, as in the following:

Vocabulary
Qʼanjobʼal consists of groups of roots that can take affixes. Words are traditionally classified as nouns, adjectives, adverbs, intransitive and transitive verbs, particles, and positionals. Positionals are a group of roots which cannot function as words on their own; in combination with affixes they are used to describe relationships of position and location. Particles are words that do not take affixes; they mostly function in adverbial roles, and include such things as interrogative particles, affirmative/negative words, markers of time and location, conjunctions, prepositions and demonstratives.

Locatives are often formed by placing a noun after a possessed body-part term: s-ti bʼe, 'edge of the road' < 'its-mouth road' and s-jolom witz, 'mountaintop' or 'summit' < 'its-head mountain'. Similarly, compound nouns may be formed by placing a noun after another possessed noun: y-atutal kuyoj, 'school' < 'its-house studying'.

Numbers

 1. jun
 2. kabʼ
 3. oxebʼ
 4. kanebʼ
 5. oyebʼ 
 6. waqebʼ
 7. uqebʼ
 8. waxaqebʼ
 9. bʼalonebʼ
 10. lajonebʼ
 11. uslukʼebʼ 
 12. kabʼlajonebʼ
 13. oxlajonebʼ
 14. kanlajonebʼ
 15. holajonebʼ
 16. waqlajonebʼ
 17. uqlajonebʼ
 18. waxaqlajonebʼ
 19. balonlajonebʼ
 20. junkʼal 
 21. jun skakʼal
 22. kabʼ skakʼal
 23. oxebʼ skakʼal
 24. kanebʼ skakʼal
 25. oyeb skakʼal
 26. waqebʼ skakʼal
 27. uqebʼ skakʼal
 28. waxaqebʼ skakʼal
 29. bʼalonebʼ skakʼal
 30. lajonebʼ skakʼal
 31. uslukʼebʼ skakʼal 
 32. kabʼlajonebʼ skakʼal
 33. oxlajunebʼ skakʼal
 34. kanlajonebʼ skakʼal
 35. holajonebʼ skakʼal
 36. waqlajonebʼ skakʼal
 37. uqlajonebʼ skakʼal
 38. waxaqlajonebʼ skakʼal
 39. balonlajunebʼ skakʼal
 40. kakʼal 
 60. oxkʼal 3x20 80. kankʼal
 100. okʼal
 120. waqkʼal
 140. uqkʼal
 160. waxaqkʼal
 180. balonlajonkʼal 
 200. lajunkʼal 
 400. junkʼalwinaq
 800. kakʼalwinaq
 2000. okʼalwinaq 

Common words

Abbreviations used
ABS abstractivizer
CL  classifier
COM complete
INC incomplete
INT interrogative
IRR irrealis
NEG negative
NZR nominalizer
PL plural
PROG progressive
SFX suffix
STAT status
COMPL:completive
COM:Completive
A3S:Third-person singular absolutive
E1S:First-person singular ergative
A1S:First-person singular absolutive
E3S:Third-person singular ergative
SFX:Status suffix
INC:Incompletive
A2S: Second-person singular absolutive
E2S: Second-person singular ergative
A3: Third-person absolutive
INTER:Interrogative
A2P: Second-person plural absolutive
A3P: Third-person plural absolutive
NZR:Nominalizer

Notes

References
 
 
 
 
Lichtman, Karen (2010). IPA illustration of Q’anjob’al. University of Illinois at Urbana-Champaign.
Mateo Pedro, Pedro (2010). The acquisition of verb inflection in Qʼanjobʼal Maya: a longitudinal study''. Ph.D. dissertation, University of Kansas.

External links
 Comunidad Lingüística Qʼanjobʼal, community/sub-committee for Qʼanjobʼal at Academia de Lenguas Mayas de Guatemala [ALMG]
 ELAR archive of Qʼanjobʼal (Maya)

Agglutinative languages
Languages of Guatemala
Huehuetenango Department
Mayan languages
Mesoamerican languages
Articles citing INALI
Verb–object–subject languages